Balao Canton is a canton of Ecuador, located in the Guayas Province.  Its capital is the town of Balao.  Its population at the 2010 census was 20,523.

Demographics
Ethnic groups as of the Ecuadorian census of 2010:
Mestizo  77.7%
Afro-Ecuadorian  9.6%
Montubio  6.3%
White  5.4%
Indigenous  0.6%
Other  0.4%

References

Cantons of Guayas Province